Siah Darreh (also Romanized as Sīāh Darreh and Seyāh Darreh; also known as Siah Darra) is a village in Horr Rural District, Dinavar District, Sahneh County, Kermanshah Province, Iran. At the 2006 census, its population was 76, in 24 families.

References 

Populated places in Sahneh County